Lee Eun-ok (born 25 October 1947) is a South Korean volleyball player. She competed in the women's tournament at the 1968 Summer Olympics.

References

1947 births
Living people
South Korean women's volleyball players
Olympic volleyball players of South Korea
Volleyball players at the 1968 Summer Olympics
Sportspeople from Seoul